Vít Baránek (born 27 September 1974) is a former Czech football goalkeeper.

External links
 Profile at iDNES.cz
 Profile at Baník Ostrava website

Czech footballers
Czech First League players
FC Baník Ostrava players
FC VSS Košice players
FC Fastav Zlín players
SFC Opava players
Slovak Super Liga players
1974 births
Living people
Sportspeople from Opava
Association football goalkeepers
FC Dolní Benešov players